Mane Braz is a Megalithic tomb located 2 km southeast of Erdeven, Brittany, France. The site comprises four side chambers and two small dolmens. It is built into a hill and appears to be the remains of a tumulus.

Megalithic monuments in Brittany
Dolmens in France
Monuments historiques of Morbihan
Tumuli in France